Punnara Phoomchareon, nicknamed Richy (born December 10, 1990 in Bangkok) is a beauty queen from Thailand. She joined the Miss Thailand Universe 2010; she was runner-up on March 20, 2010 in Bangkok, Thailand. She is currently studying Social Communication Innovation and standing 173 cm.

Fontip Watcharatrakul won the Miss Thailand Universe 2010 crown and this gave her the opportunity to compete in the Miss Universe 2010 pageant.

Biography
She primarily educated from Wattana Wittaya Academy in Bangkok, Thailand.

She's currently studying Social Communication Innovation bachelor's degree at Srinakharinwirot University in Thailand.

External links
Miss Thailand Universe Official Website
Punnara Phoomchareon on Twitter

Living people
Punnara Phoomchareon
1990 births